Stephen Cochran (born September 17, 1979) is an American country music singer and songwriter.   In 2009 Stephen was named as a spokesman for the United States Department of Veterans Affairs (VA) Research and Development.  The VA and Cochran collaborated to produce a music video for veterans who need help.

History and music career
Stephen Cochran was primarily raised by his single mother Janey Cochran, however when Cochran was four years old, he began spending summers with his grandparents Charles and Lois Maynard in Waterford, Michigan.  Some of Stephens closest friends are from that time in his life and considers Michigan just as much a hometown as Kentucky and Tennessee.  After moving from Eastern, Kentucky to Tennessee he was raised in Nashville's songwriting and recording community.  He watched his father, Steve Cochran, wrestle with the machinery of Music Row as a struggling songwriter and artist. Country greats Bobby Bare and the late Del Reeves are just a few of the characters that influenced Cochran's early music home life. Cochran cultivated an interest in music beginning at Hunters Lane Comprehensive High School in Nashville, Tennessee.  Later, he honed his craft in his college days at Western Kentucky University with a development deal.  He worked his way through school writing songs and playing guitar. While at WKU he also helped found and played lacrosse.  After September 2001 he joined the United States Marine Corps and served his country as a Marine in Iraq and Afghanistan.  He was a part of the 2nd Light Armored Reconnaissance Battalion; 1st Marine Expeditionary Force. While on convoy security Cochran was injured, leaving his back broken and without the use of his legs for some time.  Stephen was told he may never walk without pain again and he was sent home to the United States.  Once he arrived home the search for a solution began.  Finally, after a long struggle, Cochran's ability to walk without pain was restored when doctors at the Nashville VA Medical Center performed an experimental procedure called kyphoplasty.  After an extensive rehabilitation Stephen was able to return to an active lifestyle.  As part of his recovery, Cochran refocused his energy on country music.

He teamed up with other country music artists and began performing with John Rich and the MuzikMafia around Nashville.  He wrote with his friend from the band Trailer Choir Vinny Hickerson and eventually, they started their own writers' group.  In 2007 he began Armed Forces Entertainment tours of the Middle East, scores of benefit appearances on behalf of his fellow veterans, and constant roadwork in support of his acclaimed, self-titled debut album.  In November 2008 Cochran appeared on ABC's Good Morning America to promote the second annual "Salute to the Troops" benefit concert.

In 2009 the VA asked Stephen to be the face of their research and development.  Cochran and Mark Melloan wrote "Hope," which the VA used as a theme song in its national campaign to help veterans.  The VA hospitals and patients are the backdrops for the video.

In 2012, Cochran signed a production contract with New Voice Entertainment.

In 2013, Stephen formed the live-music group titled "Stephen Cochran Project" including bandmate "Smitty" Byrne (BGV/Bass)

The Stephen Cochran Project released their first self-titled album in 2015.

In 2014 Stephen and fellow Veterans Daniel Dean, Sam Tate, Sal Gonzalez, Jonathon Wells, Wynn Taylor, Micha Howard, Tyler Jay,Chris Turner, Doc Malicious Michael Hamilton,Daniel Brodeick and a slew of other Vets turned music makers formed and began touring in support of their not for profit Stop22 tour which then linked to Romans Warrior foundation forming Romans Warrior foundation- Stop22Tour. They use their songs and songwriting to help other's understand the Veterans plight as well as the suicide epidemic that plagues the Veteran Community. "It also helps our fellow veterans heal through our music", said Dean at a concert in 2017 at the Fonanel. Look for their "in the round" style concerts in several parts of the country and overseas. 
     Stephen then teamed up with fellow Veteran and longtime friends Michael Hamilton and Daniel Broadrick to put out a non-genre EP titled "American Loser", it includes 6 new tracks all written or co-written by Cochran and Hamilton directed at helping other veterans heal and educate civilians about the veteran lifestyle.

Personal Life: Stephen is Married to Megan Rae Cochran, together they have one dog named CoCo.They have five kids, Aaron Ryder, Addy Rae, Stephen Eugene III (Tripp), Katherine Ann and  Charles Caswell. 
In August of 2021 Stephens longtime best friend and service dog Semper Fi died due to complications with cancer. At the end of that month Stephens mother Janey Cochran and his grandmother Lois Maynard contracted the novel Coronavirus. 
Stephen's  grandmother died on September 5th followed by his mother's passing October 9th. The three of them were Stephens biggest support and best friends ..he always referred to them as "His Ladies".

Discography

Albums
 Stephen Cochran (2007)
 "Leaving Louisiana" (Walmart Flowers) (2010) 
 "Pieces" (2012)
 "Stephen Cochran Project" (2015)
 "American Loser" {Americana}(2017)

Singles
"Friday Night Fireside" (2007)
"Everything We Knew" (2008)
"Thinkin I'm Drinkin" (2008)
"Wal-Mart Flowers" (2009)
"Alone on Christmas" (2010)
"Hope" (2011)
"Pieces" (2012)
"Gasoline on a Goodbye" (2014)
"She'll thank me Later" (2015)
"Whiskey Lies" (2016)
"American Loser"(2017)

Music Videos
"Friday Night Fireside" (2007)
"Pieces" (2012)

Collaborations
Lindsey Cardinale's 2009 single, "Always on My Mind"
Annabelle Bainum's 2010 single,  "Alone on Christmas"

References

External links
 
 

American country singer-songwriters
1979 births
Living people
American male singer-songwriters
United States Marine Corps personnel of the Iraq War
United States Marine Corps personnel of the War in Afghanistan (2001–2021)
Western Kentucky University alumni
American country guitarists
American male guitarists
American humanitarians
People from Pikeville, Kentucky
Place of birth missing (living people)
United States Marines
Country musicians from Kentucky
Musicians from Appalachia
People from Waterford, Michigan
Musicians from Nashville, Tennessee
Singer-songwriters from Kentucky
Singer-songwriters from Tennessee
Singer-songwriters from Michigan
Guitarists from Kentucky
Guitarists from Michigan
Guitarists from Tennessee
21st-century American singers
Country musicians from Tennessee
Country musicians from Michigan
21st-century American guitarists
21st-century American male singers